In Greek and Roman mythology, Dēĭŏpēa (Ancient Greek: Δηϊοπεία) may refer to two characters:

 Deiopea, one of the Nereids, thus daughter of the Old Man of the Sea, Nereus and the Oceanid Doris. She was one of nymphs in the train of Cyrene along with her sisters, Ephyre, Opis and Arethusa.

 Deiopea, one of Juno's fourteen nymphs. She is described in the Virgil's Aeneid as being praestanti corpore, i.e., having an excellent body. Juno promises her in marriage to the king of the winds, Aeolus, in return for his help in shipwrecking the Trojan refugees.

Notes

References 

 Gaius Julius Hyginus, Fabulae from The Myths of Hyginus translated and edited by Mary Grant. University of Kansas Publications in Humanistic Studies. Online version at the Topos Text Project.
 Publius Vergilius Maro, Aeneid. Theodore C. Williams. trans. Boston. Houghton Mifflin Co. 1910. Online version at the Perseus Digital Library.
Publius Vergilius Maro, Bucolics, Aeneid, and Georgics. J. B. Greenough. Boston. Ginn & Co. 1900. Latin text available at the Perseus Digital Library.
Publius Vergilius Maro, Bucolics, Aeneid, and Georgics of Vergil. J. B. Greenough. Boston. Ginn & Co. 1900. Online version at the Perseus Digital Library.

Nereids
Aeneid